"In the Air Tonite" is a reworking of Phil Collins' 1981 single "In the Air Tonight" recorded by American rapper Lil' Kim for the R&B/hip hop Phil Collins tribute album Urban Renewal. The song, promoted as a duet between Collins and Lil' Kim, was released in 2001 as the second single from the album. The song's accompanying music video combines scenes from the original video with new scenes featuring Lil' Kim. The single has been certified Platinum in Germany by the IFPI. And this song by Lil' Kim, has been voted by Q Magazine, as number three of the «50 best albums of all time». With the exception of the sample of the song In The Air Tonight, Phil is not present on this album.

Track listings
UK CD single
 "In the Air Tonite" (Boogieman Radio version)
 "In the Air Tonite" (Stargate remix)
 "In the Air Tonite" (Mintman Floorfiller mix)
 "In the Air Tonite" (Boogieman's album version)
 "In the Air Tonite" (True Business remix)

German CD single
 "In the Air Tonite" (Soulforce Club mix)
 "In the Air Tonite" (Soulforce Sunshine mix)
 "In the Air Tonite" (Soulforce Monster dub)

Charts and certifications

References

2001 singles
Lil' Kim songs
Phil Collins songs
Songs written by Phil Collins
Songs written by Lil' Kim
2001 songs
Warner Music Group singles